The 1927–28 Washington State Cougars men's basketball team represented Washington State College for the  college basketball season. Led by second-year head coach Karl Schlademan, the Cougars were members of the Pacific Coast Conference and played their home games on campus in Pullman, Washington.

Schlademan was the track and field coach for the Cougars until 1940, but this was his final year as head basketball coach.  He was succeeded by alumnus Jack Friel, who was the head coach at North Central High School in Spokane, and won the state title in his third and final season at NCHS in 1928. A former team captain and all-conference player under Fred Bohler, Friel led Washington State as head coach for three decades.

References

External links
Sports Reference – Washington State Cougars: 1927–28 basketball season

Washington State Cougars men's basketball seasons
Washington State Cougars
Washington State
Washington State